At least two ships of the Hellenic Navy have borne the name Tombazis after Greek naval hero Iakovos Tombazis:

 , a  launched in 1941 as HMS Tamarisk and transferred to Greece and renamed in 1943. She was scrapped in 1952.
 , a  launched in 1945 as USS Gurke she was transferred to Greece in 1977 and renamed. She was stricken in 1997.

Hellenic Navy ship names